Elytracanthinini is a tribe of longhorn beetles of the subfamily Lamiinae. It contains the single genus Elytracanthina.

Taxonomy
 Elytracanthina propinqua (Lane, 1959)
 Elytracanthina pugionata (Lane, 1955)

References

Lamiinae